Anthony William Watson McDonald-Tipungwuti (born 22 April 1993) is a professional Australian rules football player for the Essendon Football Club in the Australian Football League (AFL). He was drafted by Essendon with their second selection in the 2015 rookie draft. McDonald-Tipungwuti made his debut in Round 1 of the 2016 season against the Gold Coast Suns. He announced his retirement on 20 May 2022, however returned to Essendon on 10 November 2022.

Early life
McDonald-Tipungwuti was born and raised on the Tiwi Islands, off the coast of Darwin, into an Indigenous Australian family. He played his junior football for the Tiwi Bombers in the Northern Territory Football League before moving to Victoria at the age of 17 to better his chances of an AFL career. He was adopted by Jane McDonald in Gippsland and took on her name as recognition of her contribution to his journey, joining the family as the youngest brother. He attended school at Chairo Christian School in Drouin after moving to Victoria where he learnt to speak English. He spent six years playing for the Gippsland Power in the TAC Cup and Essendon's reserves team in the VFL before realising his dream when he was rookie listed by Essendon at the end of 2015.

AFL career
Following the many suspensions handed out to Essendon players at the end of 2015 for the supplements controversy fallout, McDonald-Tipungwuti was elevated to the Bombers' senior list. He made his AFL debut in Round 1 of the 2016 season against the Gold Coast Suns at Metricon Stadium, and he retained his position in the team until his retirement. In July 2020, he broke the record for most consecutive AFL games for Essendon in the AFL era. His streak ended at 126 games when he decided not to play in Round 22, 2021, due to personal reasons.

McDonald-Tipungwuti has finished in the top 10 for the Crichton Medal, Essendon's best-and-fairest award, each season of his career—5th in 2018; 7th in 2016, 2017, and 2020; 8th in 2019; and 10th in 2021 despite not playing in the club's final three games. He was also Essendon’s leading goalkicker in the shortened 2020 season, with 19 goals.

McDonald-Tipungwuti announced his retirement on 20 May 2022, however he later revoked his retirement on 10 November 2022.

Statistics
Statistics are correct to the end of the 2022 season

|- style="background-color: #EAEAEA"
! scope="row" style="text-align:center" | 2016
|  || 43 || 21 || 8 || 9 || 186 || 127 || 313 || 89 || 67 || 0.4 || 0.4 || 8.9 || 6.0 || 14.9 || 4.2 || 3.2
|-
! scope="row" style="text-align:center" | 2017
|  || 43 || 23 || 34 || 17 || 179 || 121 || 71 || 78 || 84 || 1.5 || 0.7 || 7.8 || 5.3 || 13.0 || 3.4 || 3.7
|- style="background-color: #EAEAEA"
! scope="row" style="text-align:center" | 2018
|  || 43 || 22 || 26 || 14 || 160 || 110 || 270 || 75 || 99 || 1.2 || 0.6 || 7.3 || 5.0 || 12.3 || 3.4 || 4.5
|- 
! scope="row" style="text-align:center" | 2019
|  || 43 || 23 || 32 || 13 || 166 || 97 || 263 || 66 || 99 || 1.4 || 0.6 || 7.2 || 4.2 || 11.4 || 2.9 || 4.3
|- style="background-color: #EAEAEA"
! scope="row" style="text-align:center" | 2020
|  || 43 || 17 || 19 || 7 || 86 || 61 || 147 || 35 || 57 || 1.1 || 0.4 || 5.1 || 3.6 || 8.7 || 2.1 || 3.6
|-
! scope="row" style="text-align:center" | 2021
|  || 43 || 20 || 34 || 14 || 129 || 72 || 201 || 49 || 56 || 1.7 || 0.7 || 6.5 || 3.6 || 10.1 || 2.5 || 2.8
|- class="sortbottom"
! colspan=3| Career
! 126
! 153
! 74
! 906
! 588
! 1265
! 392
! 462
! 1.2
! 0.6
! 7.2
! 4.7
! 10.0
! 3.1
! 3.7
|}

References

External links

1993 births
Living people
Essendon Football Club players
Indigenous Australian players of Australian rules football
Tiwi Islands people
Australian rules footballers from the Northern Territory